Mallotus distans is a species of plant in the family Euphorbiaceae. It is native to South India and Sri Lanka.

Leaves
opposite and alternate and ovate-lanceolate or oblong, acute or acuminate, base rounded.

Flowers
Inflorescence-axillary spikes.

Fruits
3-lobed capsule.

References

distans
Flora of Sri Lanka
Flora of India (region)
Taxa named by Johannes Müller Argoviensis